Brandon Yaw Joseph-Buadi (born 2 October 1997) is an English professional footballer who plays for American side Manhattan Jaspers as a forward.

Club career

Born in Brighton, Joseph-Buadi joined Portsmouth's youth categories in 2004. He signed a two-year scholarship contract on 4 July 2014.

Joseph-Buadi made his professional debut on 1 September 2015, starting in a 0–2 Football League Trophy away defeat against Exeter City. He was released by Pompey the following May, after his scholarship ended.

On 10 August 2016, Joseph-Buadi joined Worthing, but left the club shortly after.  In 2017 he moved to the United States, joining Manhattan College's Manhattan Jaspers.

Career statistics

References

External links

1997 births
Living people
Footballers from Brighton
English footballers
Association football forwards
Portsmouth F.C. players
Bognor Regis Town F.C. players
Worthing F.C. players
Manhattan Jaspers soccer players
English expatriate footballers
English expatriate sportspeople in the United States
Expatriate soccer players in the United States